The 1981 Lorraine Open was a men's tennis tournament played on Indoor carpet courts. The event was part of the 1981 Volvo Grand Prix and was played in Nancy in France. It was the third edition of the tournament and was held from 16 March through 22 March 1981. Seventh-seeded Pavel Složil won the singles title.

Finals

Singles
 Pavel Složil defeated  Ilie Năstase 6–2, 7–5
 It was Složil's first singles title of his career.

Doubles
 Ilie Năstase /  Adriano Panatta defeated  John Feaver /  Jiří Hřebec 6–4, 2–6, 6–4

References

External links
 ITF tournament edition details

Lorraine Open
Lorraine Open
Lorraine Open
Lorraine Open